Mission No. X is the tenth studio album by German heavy metal band U.D.O., released on 30 September 2005 via AFM Records. The original release date was announced for 4 October, but was pushed forward by one week. 

Previous drummer Lorenzo Milani left the band due to "personal reasons" after the release of Thunderball and was replaced by Edge of Forever drummer Francesco Jovino.

Track listing

Notes
 The enhanced edition release by AFM Records contains the "Mean Streets" music video.
 The limited edition release by CD-Maximum contains the 24/7 EP along with the "Mean Streets" music video.

Personnel 
U.D.O.
 Udo Dirkschneider – vocals
 Stefan Kaufmann – guitar, producer, engineer, mixing
 Igor Gianola – guitar
 Fitty Wienhold – bass
 Francesco Jovino – drums

Additional musicians
 Mathias Dieth – solo guitar on "Way of Life"
 Johannes Schiefner – uilleann pipes on "Cry Soldier Cry"

Production
 Manfred Melchior – mastering
 Martin Häusler – cover art, design
 Dirk Schelpmeier – photography

References 

2005 albums
U.D.O. albums
AFM Records albums